The A989 is a road in Perth, Scotland. The road was constructed around 1985.

Route
The road has five major intersections (clockwise from the north): West Bridge Street (A85; crosses the River Tay via Smeaton's Bridge, leading east/west to and from Bridgend), South Street (A93; crosses the River Tay via the Queen's Bridge leading east/west to and from Bridgend), Edinburgh Road (A912; leading south), York Place (A93; leading west) and Barrack Street (A912; leading north).

Its name changes several times over its near two-mile course (again, clockwise from the north): in the vicinity of the North Inch, it is Atholl Street, becoming Charlotte Street to the east, then south onto Tay Street, which runs along the western banks of the Tay. Turning east at Tay Street's junction with Shore Road in the south, it becomes Marshall Place, then King's Place, as it passes the South Inch. Turning north at Perth railway station it becomes Leonard Street. Opposite Perth bus station, it turns east, becoming St Andrew Street briefly, then Caledonian Road. Finally, in the northwestern corner of the city centre, the road becomes Atholl Street again.

Notable building and structures
The following buildings and structures stand beside the road.

Statue of Albert, Prince Consort, Charlotte Street
Royal George Hotel – has an entrance from Tay Street
Municipal building, 1–5 High Street and 8–18 Tay Street
2 High Street, southern elevation is on Tay Street
St Matthew's (formerly West) Church, Tay Street
26 Tay Street – formerly Perth Savings Bank
Sheriff Court, former site of Gowrie House, 46–52 Tay Street
Perth Water Works, Marshall Place
St Leonard's-in-the-Fields Church, Marshall Place
Statue of Sir Walter Scott, King's Place at the South Inch
Perth railway station, King Street
Station Hotel, Leonard Street
Perth bus station, Leonard Street
St Ninian's Cathedral, Atholl Street

Gallery

References

External links
The A989 traffic conditions at Navbug.uk

Streets in Perth, Scotland